Inlecypris jayarami is a danionin cyprinid from Lake Inle, Myanmar. Fishbase place this species in the monotypic genus Inlecypris but it is considered by some authorities.e.g. the IUCN, to be better placed in the genus Devario

References

 

Devario
Freshwater fish of Southeast Asia
Endemic fauna of Myanmar
Fish described in 1984